"Get Some Sleep" is a song by New Zealand singer-songwriter Bic Runga. It was released in June 2002 as the lead single from her second studio album, Beautiful Collision. The song was the highest-selling song by a New Zealand artist in 2002, ranking at number six on the country's year-end ranking and peaking at number three on the RIANZ Singles Chart. The song also reached number 27 in Ireland, number 78 in the United Kingdom, and number 92 in Australia.

Track listings
New Zealand CD single (672749.2)
 "Get Some Sleep"
 "You Don't Want to Know"
 "Gracie"

Australian CD single (COL 674125 1)
 "Get Some Sleep" (album version)
 "Get Some Sleep" (remix airplay edit)

UK and Irish CD single (674548 2)
 "Get Some Sleep"
 "Bursting Through" (CSO live version)

Charts

Weekly charts

Year end charts

Release history

References

External links
 Bic's official website

2002 singles
2002 songs
Bic Runga songs
Columbia Records singles
Songs written by Bic Runga